Rasmus Rosenqvist (born 17 July 1997) is a Swedish footballer.

References

External links 
 

Swedish footballers
Allsvenskan players
Superettan players
1996 births
Living people
IF Elfsborg players
Helsingborgs IF players
GAIS players
Association football midfielders